Chilumba is a town in Malawi. It is an urban centre in Karonga District.

Location
Chilumba is located along the western shores of Lake Malawi, at the southern end of Karonga District, in the Northern Region of Malawi. The geographical coordinates of Chilumba are:10°26'15.0"S, 34°14'51.0"E (Latitude:-10.437500; Longitude:34.247500).

Population
In 2011, the population of Chilumba was estimated at about 5,000 people.

Overview
The section of lake facing Chilumba is called Chilumba Bay.
The MV Ilala a steamboat, which connects the main settlements on Lake Malawi, has Chilumba as its northernmost stop. Once it has reached Chilumba, it starts its travel back to its base in Lusumbwe in the Southern Region of Malawi.

Heterogeneity in landscape gives Chilumba a unique environment for diversification of recreation and production activities. From the lake side, it is one of the unique places with Chirwa Island and Chitende Island, that host several species of plants, birds and fishes. The Islands are used by fishermen as temporary docking points.

The peninsula facing Chirwa is a typical feature with rocky shore with deep waters potentially suitable for rock diving. The bay facing the jetty has shallow waters for docking boats and potential for shallow water walking to 50m then swim into deep waters facing the Chitende Peninsula and Mphiri hills. West of the peninsula lies a  stretch of pure sand beach. The upper land away from the lake is prime agricultural land used during the 1980s to early 1990s as a maize seed production diversification scheme. Behind lies a natural boundary of forest reserve that extends to the lake through Mphiri hills to the north, ideal for horse riding.

References

Lake Malawi
Karonga District
Populated places in Northern Region, Malawi